The Uber Cup, sometimes called the World Women's Team Championships, is a major international badminton competition contested by women's national badminton teams. First held in 1956–1957 and contested at three year intervals, it has been contested every two years since 1984 when its scheduled times and venues were merged with those of Thomas Cup, the world men's team championship. In 2007, the Badminton World Federation decided to have Thomas and Uber Cup finals separated again but the proposal was ultimately abandoned. The Uber Cup is named after a former British women's badminton player, Betty Uber, who in 1950 had the idea of hosting a women's event similar to the men's. She also made the draw for the 1956–1957 inaugural tournament, which took place at Lytham St. Annes in Lancashire, England.

The cup follows a similar format to that of the men's competition of the Thomas Cup. As of the 2020 tournament, China is the most successful team, having won 15 titles. Japan is second, having won it six times, followed by Indonesia and United States, each with three cups. South Korea are the current champions, having won its second title after beating title holders China in the 2022 edition.

Trophy
The Uber Cup trophy was officially presented at the annual general meeting in 1956, the year the first Uber Cup tournament was first held. It was made by Mappin & Webb, prominent silversmiths on Regent Street in London. The trophy is 20 inches high with a rotating globe on top of a plinth and a female player standing on top of a shuttlecock.

Results

1957–1981

1984–1988

1990–present

Successful national teams
So far, only five countries have won the Uber Cup with China the most successful team, with 15 titles, followed by Japan (six titles), Indonesia (three titles), the United States (three titles) and Korea (two titles). The Uber Cup has only spread to two continents so far: Asia and North America.

Nine teams have made it into the finals. The finalists other than the five winner countries above are Denmark, England, the Netherlands and Thailand. Sweden, Hong Kong, Germany, Chinese Taipei and India are the other fives teams which have made it into the final four.

italic text = hosts

Team appearances at the final stages

, 28 teams have qualified in the history of the competition for the final stages of the Uber Cup. Asia and Europe are the continent with the most teams, at ten. Africa and Oceania have each had three teams that qualified, while Canada and United States are the only team that has qualified from Pan America.

Below is the list of teams that have appeared in the final stage of Uber Cup as of the 2022 tournament.

26 times

22 times

20 times

14 times

13 times

12 times

11 times

10 times

9 times

8 times

6 times

5 times

3 times

2 times

1 time

References

 
Recurring sporting events established in 1956
World championships in badminton